Associazione Sportiva Dilettante Cecina is an Italian association football club located in Cecina, Tuscany. It currently plays in Serie D. Its colors are red and blue.

External links
Cecina page at Serie-D.com

Football clubs in Tuscany
Association football clubs established in 1924
Serie C clubs
1924 establishments in Italy